TEDA Hospital is a general hospital in the Binhai New Area of the Chinese metropolis of Tianjin, named for the Tianjin Economic-Technological Development Area.  In 2015, victims of the Tianjin explosions were taken there for treatment.

References

External links 
 

Hospitals in Tianjin